Nguyễn Cao Kỳ Duyên (born 13 November 1996) is a Vietnamese model and beauty pageant titleholder who won Miss Vietnam 2014.

Personal life
Duyên was born in Nam Định. She is a student of French language at the Foreign Trade University. Her father idolized Paris by Night host Nguyễn Cao Kỳ Duyên and thus named her the same.

Television

References

External links

1996 births
Living people
 American Buddhists
 Vietnamese Buddhists
Miss Vietnam winners
The Amazing Race contestants